Women's cricket at the 2019 South Asian Games was held in Pokhara, Nepal from 2 to 8 December 2019. The women's event featured teams from  Bangladesh, Sri Lanka, Maldives and Nepal. Sri Lanka named an under-23 squad, while matches played between Bangladesh, Maldives and Nepal were granted Women's Twenty20 International status. Matches were played at the Pokhara Stadium.

On 2 December 2019, the Maldives played their first-ever WT20I match, when they faced Nepal in the opening match of the tournament. In the same match, Anjali Chand of Nepal took six wickets without conceding a run. On 5 December 2019, Bangladesh beat the Maldives by 249 runs, with the Maldives bowled out for just six runs in their innings.

Nepal beat the Maldives by ten wickets in the play-off match to win the bronze medal. In the match, the Maldives were dismissed for just eight runs, to record the second lowest total in a WT20I match. Only one run came from the bat, with the other seven runs coming from wides. Nine cricketers were dismissed without scoring.

In the final, Bangladesh beat Sri Lanka by two runs to win the gold medal. Bangladesh defended seven runs from the final over of the match to win their first ever gold in cricket at the South Asian Games.

Format
The four participating nations played matches on a round-robin basis. The top two teams progressed to the final, while the third and fourth sides met in the bronze medal match.

Squads

Round-robin stage

Points table

Fixtures

Medal round

Bronze medal match

Gold medal match

See also 
 Cricket at the 2019 South Asian Games – Men's tournament

References

External links
 Series home at ESPN Cricinfo
Official Website of 2019 South Asian Games

Associate international cricket competitions in 2019–20
International cricket competitions in Nepal
Cricket